Time and the Rani is the first serial of the 24th season of the British science fiction television series Doctor Who, which was first broadcast in four weekly parts from 7 to 28 September 1987. It was the first to feature Sylvester McCoy as the Seventh Doctor, who regenerates from the Sixth Doctor at the start of the story after Colin Baker was dismissed from the role.

In the serial, the renegade Time Lady the Rani (Kate O'Mara) brings the greatest geniuses from time and space to her laboratory on the planet Lakertya so she can use their minds to power her time manipulator.

Plot

Whilst in flight, the TARDIS is attacked by the Rani, an amoral scientist and renegade Time Lord. The TARDIS crash-lands on the planet Lakertya. On the floor of the console room, the Sixth Doctor regenerates into the Seventh Doctor. In his post-regenerative confusion the Doctor is separated from Mel and tricked into assisting the Rani in her megalomaniac scheme to construct a giant time manipulator.

Lost on the barren surface of the planet, Mel has to avoid the Rani's ingenious traps and her monstrous, bat-like servants, the Tetraps. She joins forces with a rebel faction among the Lakertyans, desperate to end the Rani's control of their planet. The Doctor must recover his wits in time to avoid becoming a permanent part of the Rani's plan to collect the genius of the greatest scientific minds in the universe, of which she has captured many including Albert Einstein, in order that she can create a time manipulator, which would allow the Rani to control time anywhere in the universe, at the expense of all life on Lakertya.

The Doctor manages to foil her plan and free the Lakertyans of her evil control. The Rani escapes in her TARDIS, but it has been commandeered by the Tetraps, who take her prisoner. The Doctor takes all the captured geniuses on board his TARDIS so that he can return them home.

Production
This story's working title was Strange Matter. The story was initially written for Colin Baker and the Sixth Doctor, with the opening scene, intended to be a depiction of the Judgement of Solomon, dropped to accommodate the regeneration.

Cast notes
Wanda Ventham and Donald Pickering previously appeared together in The Faceless Ones. Donald Pickering also appeared in The Keys of Marinus.  Wanda Ventham also appeared in Image of the Fendahl. Due to Colin Baker being fired, the role of the sixth doctor was also played by Sylvestor McCoy.

Broadcast and reception

Reviewing Time and the Rani, Tat Wood criticised the story's dialogue and plot, but praised the direction as "visually impressive". A 2014 poll held by 
Doctor Who Magazine ranked Time and the Rani as the third worst story in the show's run, behind only "Fear Her" and The Twin Dilemma.

Newly appointed script editor Andrew Cartmel said there were many things he disliked about the script, which he felt lacked depth: "This was a story which wasn't about anything—and, frustratingly, it was Sylvester McCoy's debut." Cartmel also stated that the Bakers’ scripts were also disliked by other members of the cast and crew including producer John Nathan-Turner.

Commercial releases

In print

A novelisation of this serial, written by Pip and Jane Baker, was published by Target Books in December 1987. The novel features a longer finale for the Sixth Doctor (and reveals that the regeneration into the Seventh Doctor was caused by "tumultuous buffeting" when the Rani attacked the TARDIS), while the Tetraps seem to speak English backwards.

Home media
Time and the Rani was released on VHS by BBC Worldwide in July 1995. It was released on region 2 DVD on 13 September 2010, and on region 1 DVD on 14 June 2011. In June 2021 it was released as part of the Doctor Who: The Collection Season 24 blu-ray box set, which includes an optional extended cut of all four episodes. This serial was also released as part of the Doctor Who DVD Files in Issue 99 on 17 October 2012.

References

External links

Target novelisation

Doctor Who serials novelised by Pip and Jane Baker
Seventh Doctor serials
The Rani (Doctor Who) stories
1987 British television episodes
Sixth Doctor serials
Television episodes written by Pip and Jane Baker
Doctor Who regeneration stories